Finnish national symbols are natural symbols or Finnish national works and prominent figures that are commonly associated with Finland. The most recognized national symbols include the flag of Finland and the lion featured on the Finnish coat of arms.

National symbols

National symbols from nature

Prominent national figures

See also 

 Finlandia
 Björneborgarnas marsch
 Sisu
 Folklore of Finland
 National landscapes of Finland

References